Tantowi Yahya (born 29 October 1960 in Palembang) is an Indonesian artist, presenter and politician who is a former Ambassador of Indonesia to New Zealand, Samoa and Tonga. He is most famous for hosting the Indonesian version of Who Wants to Be a Millionaire?. In 2009, Tantowi became member of Indonesian parliament from Golkar Party, representing South Sumatra province. In 2014, he was reelected and this time he represented the capital city, Jakarta.

Personal life
Tantowi was born in Palembang, South Sumatra on 29 October 1960 as the fourth child out of five children of ethnic Palembangese Malay parents named Yahya Matusin and Komariah, he was born and raised in a simple family background. His father, Yahya sold used glasses for living. Believing that English is a key to success, at the age of 14, he sent Tantowi and his younger brother, Helmy to an English course in Palembang. Yahya Matusin was a multi talented man.  He was known as a great footballer, badminton player, a religious leader, accordion player and also an avid singer.

Tantowi married his wife, Dewi Handayani in 1989 and has two sons, Mohammad Adjani Prasanna Yahya (born on 11 April 2001) and Mohammad Alano Panditta Yahya (born on 20 April 2006). Tantowi is the elder brother of Helmy Yahya, a famous TV host and TV program maker as well as the former President Director of Indonesian public television TVRI.

Television
Tantowi's early success is as host of TV show "Gita Remaja" in 1989 on TVRI. His best known career however came in 2001, from that year to 2006, he hosted the Indonesian version of Who Wants to Be a Millionaire? on RCTI. The next program he hosted was the Deal or No Deal Indonesia also on RCTI. In 2009 he hosted the local adaptation of Are You Smarter Than a 5th Grader? this time on Global TV, but his sparkling career in television was cut short by his election into Indonesian House of Representative following his electoral victory in 2009 Indonesian legislative election.

Country music
Tantowi fell in love with country music when he first listened country songs of Elvis Presley when he was seven. It was his neighbour who lived next door who occasionally played Everly Brothers, Ricky Nelson, Patsy Cline and other country artists on his phonogram who then made him an avid country music fan. Though he had wide opportunity to record his voice, Tantowi only released his first country single Gone, Gone, Gone in 2000. Following success of this single, he then produced his first album Country Breeze, which was sold over 500,000 copies. His music success lead him to become host of "Country Road" music show in TVRI. He was dubbed as "the most popular country singer in Indonesia". He stated that country music is his "second religion". Tantowi Yahya is the founder of Country Music Club of Indonesia. He owned music label, Ceepee and event organizer CDP which organized Indonesian Beauty Pageants, the Indonesian Music Awards, AMI Awards and television award, Panasonic Awards. In 2005, Tantowi visited the United States under a Multi-Nation Program by Eisenhower Fellowship. There he visited Nashville, center of country music industry. Representing Indonesia, Tantowi appeared as global artist at CMA Music Festival in Nashville in 2006. As a country singer, he has produced 10 albums with sale over 3 million copies combined.

Politics
In 2009 election, Tantowi ran for a seat of People's Representative Council (DPR) as delegate from Golkar Party. He won the election by 240.000 votes and represented his native South Sumatra for the period of 2009–2014. As parliamentarian, Tantowi was placed on Commission I overseeing Defense, Intelligence, Media and Informatics and Foreign Affairs.

In June 2013 Tantowi caused controversy when he visited Israel, as Indonesia does not formally recognize the state and does not have a diplomatic relationship with it. The criticism came primarily from conservative Muslims, primarily the controversial Islamic Defender Front (Front Pembela Islam/FPI). FPI's spokesman Munarman stated that Tantowi "ignored suffering of Palestinians" and stated that Tantowi should have visited Gaza instead.

In September 2013, in an interview by ABC, he publicly declared Indonesian's opposition to Australia's government policy on asylum seekers, which involved towing back asylum boats in international water back to Indonesian territory and paying Indonesian villagers for information about people smuggling, calling it 'illegal, offensive and an affront to democracy'. This statement is in line with statement of Foreign Minister Marty Natalegawa.

In March 2017, Joko Widodo formally appointed Tantowi as the Ambassador of Indonesia to New Zealand. His place in DPR was taken by Ivan Doly Gultom.

References

External links
 Official Website

1960 births
Living people
Indonesian Muslims
Anugerah Musik Indonesia winners
English-language singers from Indonesia
Indonesian country singers
20th-century Indonesian male singers
Indonesian male actors
Indonesian people of Malay descent
Indonesian diplomats
People from Palembang
Who Wants to Be a Millionaire?
Ambassadors of Indonesia to New Zealand
Members of the People's Representative Council, 2009
Members of the People's Representative Council, 2014